Simcoe County Rovers Football Club is a Canadian semi-professional soccer club based in Barrie, Ontario, that plays in the League1 Ontario men's and women's divisions.

History
The club was founded in 2021, by former Canadian national team player Julian De Guzman, Peter Raco, and the Barrie Soccer Club under the name FC Barrie, who had initially been part of the group forming 1812 FC Barrie, before departing to form their own team.

On July 6, 2021, the club was officially unveiled under the name Simcoe County Rovers FC as a joint partnership between Raco and De Guzman. In August 2021, it was announced that Canadian national team player Cyle Larin was joining the club as a co-owner; in December 2021, fellow Canadian national team player Doneil Henry was announced as another co-owner. In January 2022, Canadian women's team player Janine Beckie also joined the ownership group. In April 2022, Atiba Hutchinson also joined the ownership group. Since its formation, the team has been affiliated with youth clubs Barrie SC and Aurora FC (who previously operated a team in League1 Ontario until 2020), and Orangeville-based school Athlete Institute.

On October 21, 2021, it was announced that the club was officially joining both the male and female divisions of League1 Ontario for 2022, acquiring the license of Aurora FC, who did not play in 2021 and joined the Rovers as an affiliate club. Both teams played their debut matches on April 24 against Blue Devils FC, with the women winning 3–0 and the men drawing 1–1. In 2022, the men's reserve team won the League1 Ontario U21 Reserve Division.

Seasons

Men

Women

Notable players
The following players have either played at the professional or international level, either before or after playing for the League1 Ontario team:

Men

Women

References

Soccer clubs in Ontario
League1 Ontario teams
Association football clubs established in 2021
Sport in Barrie
Sport in Simcoe County